The Armenian Catholic Archeparchy of Istanbul, also known as Armenian Catholic Archdiocese of Constantinople, serves Armenian Catholics in Turkey and is under the Armenian Catholic Patriarch of Cilicia. Its cathedral is St. Mary of Sakızağaç Cathedral in Istanbul.

History

The eparchy was established in 1860. It was combined with the Armenian Catholic Patriarchate of Cilicia from 1866 until 1928 and was the patriarch's see, based in Istanbul. When the patriarchal seat was moved to Beirut, Lebanon, the current archeparchy was erected on 15 October 1928. 

On 21 March 2015, it was made known that the Patriarch of Cilicia of the Armenians, with the consent of the Synod of Bishops of the Patriarchal Church, and after having informed the Holy See, had accepted the resignation of Archbishop Hovhannes Tcholakian.

Mons. Boghos Lévon Zékiyan was then elected Archbishop of Istanbul by the Synod of Bishops of the Patriarchal Church of Armenia.

In 2008 there were 3,650 Armenian Catholics belonging to the diocese.

See also
 Catholic Church in Turkey

References

1860 establishments
Istanbul
Eastern Catholic dioceses in Turkey
Armenian Catholic Church in Turkey
Armenian culture
Christianity in Istanbul